Piccolo Summit is a summit in the Fitzsimmons Range of the Garibaldi Ranges of the Pacific Ranges in southwestern British Columbia, Canada. It is located on the north side of Cheakamus Lake just southeast of the town of Whistler in Garibaldi Provincial Park. The mountain is the highest point of a group of hills called the Musical Bumps.

In 2004, volcanologist Jack Souther of the Geological Survey of Canada convinced that Piccolo Summit is composed of lava flows that erupted from a volcano about 100 million years ago during the Late Cretaceous period. Nearby Whistler Mountain is composed of lava flows and nearby Flute Summit is a subvolcanic intrusion that was formed during the same period.

See also
Gambier Group

References

External links
 
 Piccolo Summit in the Canadian Mountain Encyclopedia

Two-thousanders of British Columbia
Garibaldi Ranges
Volcanism of British Columbia
Cretaceous volcanism
New Westminster Land District